Following is a 1998 British neo-noir film directed by Christopher Nolan.

Following may also refer to:

 Cult following, a group of fans who are highly dedicated to a specific area of pop culture

In media and entertainment
 Following (solitaire), a solitaire card game which uses a deck of playing cards
 "Following", a 1987 song by the American pop band The Bangles
 "Following", a 2015 song by Scottish musician Momus from his 2015 album Turpsycore
 Following (EP), a 2017 extended play by South Korean singer Hyuna
 The Following, a 2013 American television drama series for the Fox Broadcasting Company
 The Following, an expansion for the 2015 video game Dying Light
 Friending and following, a feature on social media sites

See also

 Follow (disambiguation)